Fares Al-Ruwailli (born August 8, 1992) is a Saudi Arabian footballer who plays a midfielder.

References

1992 births
Living people
Saudi Arabian footballers
Al-Nahda Club (Saudi Arabia) players
Al-Qaisumah FC players
Al-Ain FC (Saudi Arabia) players
Saudi First Division League players
Saudi Professional League players
Saudi Second Division players
Place of birth missing (living people)
Association football midfielders